Dr. William Hammond is an American historian who specializes in the United States’ conflicts in Southeast Asia, especially Vietnam. He worked in Washington, D.C. for the Army Center of Military History. During his career, he has written two books about Korea and Vietnam and mentored several more. He is best known for his widely praised account of media and military relations during the Vietnam War. Hammond now works as an adjunct professor at the University of Maryland, College Park, teaching courses about Vietnam and military-media history.

Education

Hammond matriculated at The Catholic University of America in Washington DC. After earning his bachelor's degree in medieval history, Hammond continued at Catholic University. Hammond earned his Ph.D in history in 1972.

Career
In 1972 Hammond began working as a civilian for the United States Army Center of Military History for almost forty years, becoming Chief of the General Histories Branch. While at the Center, Hammond co-authored Black Soldier, White Army, a history of African American soldiers during the Korean War and the end of segregation in the army. His two volume series about the military and the media during Vietnam was released as a condensed version in 1998, titled Reporting Vietnam: Media and the Military at War. The book would later win the Richard W. Leopold Prize two years later. Stephen Ambrose called it "the best study of the press and the armed forces ever written."

Starting in 1991,Hammond began teaching honors seminars in the University of Maryland. He is a senior lecturer and offers classes such as the Military and the Media in American History and The United States in Vietnam.

Notable Works
 Public Affairs: The Media and the Military, 1962 - 1968 (1988)
 Public Affairs: The Military and the Media, 1968–1973 (1996)
 Black Soldier, White Army: The 24th Infantry Regiment in Korea (1996)
 Reporting Vietnam: Media and Military at War (1998)

References

External links 
 Google Books for Black Soldier, White Army
 Google Books for Reporting Vietnam

21st-century American historians
21st-century American male writers
Living people
Year of birth missing (living people)
American male non-fiction writers